Aarhus County or Århus County is a former county of Denmark (Danish: amt)  on the Jutland peninsula. It was created in 1970 by a merger of three counties: Århus, Randers and Skanderborg. The county was abolished effective 1 January 2007, when almost all of it merged into Region Midtjylland (i.e. Region Central Jutland). A very small portion was merged into Region Nordjylland (Region North Jutland). At the time of its abolishment, more than 20,000 people worked for the county.

Municipalities (1970-2006)

References 

 
Former counties of Denmark (1970–2006)
Central Denmark Region